8 Best Dates is a 2016 Russian-Ukrainian romantic comedy directed by Maryus Vaysberg. It is a sequel to the 2015 film 8 New Dates. The film stars Vera Brezhneva and Volodymyr Zelenskyy. Initially, the film was planned to be released on December 31, 2015, but the date was later postponed.

Plot
Having learned from the doctors that he has only a few weeks to live, Nikita makes the courageous decision to transfer his family and work to decent hands. An employee of the Ministry of Emergency Situations named Ilya becomes a candidate for a replacement, a decent man all around. Nikita makes every effort to “introduce” Ilya as soon as possible into his life and unexpectedly succeeds in this. Soon, Ilya becomes an excellent father for Nikita's children, an indispensable employee at the clinic and, most importantly, a very appealing man for Masha, Nikita's beautiful wife. However, the real test of this is only beginning, because Nikita soon realizes that the doctors were wrong, and in fact he will not die at all in the near future. Now he has to win back his place in the family and at work, and it turns out to be much more difficult than it seems at first glance.

Cast
Vera Brezhneva - Maria Igorevna (Masha)
Volodymyr Zelenskyy - Nikita Andreevich Sokolov
Vladimir Epifantsev - Ilya
Evgeny Koshevoy - Senya, driver of the protagonist
Sergey Kazanin - leader of the music competition
Nino Kantaria
Victor Schur
Maria Gorban - Elena Vasilyevna, Secretary

References

External links 

 

2016 films
2010s Russian-language films
2016 romantic comedy films
Russian romantic comedy films
Ukrainian romantic comedy films
Films directed by Maryus Vaysberg
Russian-language Ukrainian films
Volodymyr Zelenskyy films